Africanaspis is an extinct genus of groenlandaspidid placoderm known from two species, Africanaspis doryssa, named in 1997 from fossils discovered in South Africa and Africanaspis edmountaini, named from fossils described from South Africa during 2017. A. edmountaini is only known from juvenile specimens. Both species are known from the Witpoort Formation.

References

Fossil taxa described in 1997
Placoderms